Antimelatoma buchanani is a  species of predatory sea snail, a marine gastropod  mollusc in the family Pseudomelatomidae.

Description
The length of the shell attains 20 mm, its diameter 6 mm.

(Original description) The fusiform shell is elongated. The spire is acute. The whorls are carinated, with fine spiral lines, and obliquely plicated anteriorly. The posterior part is smooth, concave, with a slight ridge at the suture. The aperture is oval. The siphonal canal produced. The body whorl is longer than the spire.

The shell is elongate -fusiform. The whorls are obliquely longitudinally plaited, and show fine spiral ribs below the sinus area. Above the sinus area smooth, concave, with a slight ridge at the suture. Between 11 and 15 longitudinal plications on a whorl.  The aperture is oval. The siphonal canal is produced, rather bent.

The protoconch is composed of two oblique smooth turns, the anterior portion having four deep spiral sulci, cutting through the small longitudinal costae of the brephic stage, into which the protoconch imperceptibly passes.

Distribution
This marine species is endemic to New Zealand and occurs off Northland to East Cape

Fossils have been found in Pliocene strata in New Zealand.

References 

 Powell A. W. B., New Zealand Mollusca, William Collins Publishers Ltd, Auckland, New Zealand 1979 
 
 Beu, A.G. 2011: Marine Mollusca of isotope stages of the last 2 million years in New Zealand. Part 4. Gastropoda (Ptenoglossa, Neogastropoda, Heterobranchia), Journal of the Royal Society of New Zealand, 41
 Spencer, H.G., Marshall, B.A. & Willan, R.C. (2009). Checklist of New Zealand living Mollusca. pp 196–219. in: Gordon, D.P. (ed.) New Zealand inventory of biodiversity. Volume one. Kingdom Animalia: Radiata, Lophotrochozoa, Deuterostomia. Canterbury University Press, Christchurch

External links
 Spencer H.G., Willan R.C., Marshall B.A. & Murray T.J. (2011) Checklist of the Recent Mollusca Recorded from the New Zealand Exclusive Economic Zone

External links
 
 Spencer H.G., Willan R.C., Marshall B.A. & Murray T.J. (2011). Checklist of the Recent Mollusca Recorded from the New Zealand Exclusive Economic Zone

buchanani
Gastropods of New Zealand
Gastropods described in 1873